Nicholas Barry Davies FRS (born 1952) is a British field naturalist and zoologist, and Emeritus Professor of Behavioural Ecology at the University of Cambridge, where he is also a Emeritus Fellow of Pembroke College.

Research
His books with John Krebs helped to define the field of behavioural ecology, the study of how behaviour evolves in response to selection pressures from ecology and the social environment.

His study of a small brown bird, the dunnock, linked detailed behavioural observations of individuals to their reproductive success, using DNA profiles to measure paternity and maternity, and revealed how sexual conflicts gave rise to variable mating systems including: monogamy, polygyny, polyandry and polygynandry.

His studies of cuckoos and their hosts have revealed an evolutionary arms race of brood parasite adaptations and host counter-adaptations.

Other studies include: territory economics in pied wagtails; contest behaviour and mate searching in butterflies and toads; parent-offspring conflict and the transition to independence in young birds.

Awards and distinctions
Scientific Medal of the Zoological Society of London, 1987
Fellow of the Royal Society, 1994
University of Cambridge Teaching Prize, 1995
William Bate Hardy Prize of the Cambridge Philosophical Society, 1995
Medal of the Association for the Study of Animal Behaviour, 1996
President of the International Society for Behavioural Ecology, 2000-2002
British Trust for Ornithology / British Birds "Best Book of the Year Award" in 2000 (for Cuckoos, Cowbirds and Other  Cheats) and in 2015 (for Cuckoo - Cheating by Nature).

Frink Medal of the Zoological Society of London, 2001
Elliott Coues Medal of the American Ornithologists' Union, 2005
Hamilton Prize Lecture of the International Society for Behavioural Ecology, 2010
Croonian Medal and Lecture of the Royal Society, 2015
Godman Salvin Medal of the British Ornithologists' Union, 2022

Key Publications

Media

In 2009, his research was featured as a BBC Natural World program "Cuckoo", produced by Mike Birkhead and narrated by David Attenborough.

In 2011 he presented a BBC Radio 4 documentary entitled 'The Cuckoo'.

In 2016 he was the subject of a BBC Radio documentary in the series The Life Scientific.

In 2017 he was the guest of Michael Berkeley on BBC Radio 3 Private Passions.

In 2017 he appeared in an episode of the BBC Radio 4 Natural Histories series entitled "Cuckoo".

References

External links

1952 births
British zoologists
Fellows of the Royal Society
Fellows of Pembroke College, Cambridge
Living people
British ornithologists
British naturalists